The SUPARCO Satellite Ground Station is an earth observation and remote sensing satellite control center. The SUPARCO's SGS center is a major space research centre of the Space and Upper Atmosphere Research Commission (SUPARCO), focusing on the earth observational and remote sensing technology.

The space center is currently controlled by the SUPARCO. It is  located at Rawat near Islamabad, has an acquisition zone of approximately 2500 km radius and covers Pakistan and 25 other countries, wholly or partially, in the South Asian, Central Asian and Western Asia and Middle East regions. The SUPARCO's SGS center acquires and archives satellite data from different earth resources satellites. The data products and related services are offered to different user agencies within and outside Pakistan.

External links
 SUPARCO Satellite Ground Station

Space and Upper Atmosphere Research Commission
Islamabad
Space technology research institutes
Ground stations
SUPARCO facilities